Loan Chabanol (born 30 December 1982) is a French-American actress, artist, and model. She is best known for her role in John Turturro's comedy Fading Gigolo, the romantic drama Third Person, the action thriller The Transporter Refueled and the horror drama anthology TV series Tales of the Walking Dead.

Life and career
Loan Chabanol was born in Paris, France on 30 December 1982. She is of Vietnamese, German, and Italian descent. Her early years were spent in art classes with artist Bernard Bistes. Discovered at the age of 16 by Elite Model Management, she has been on the covers of magazines such as Elle and Marie Claire. In 2010, she moved to New York to study acting at Lee Strasberg Theatre and Film Institute.

Acting
Chabanol got her first feature film role in John Turturro's comedy Fading Gigolo. In 2014, she was cast as Sam in Third Person playing a significant compassionate character along with Mila Kunis. In 2015, she was cast as a lead "femme fatale" in The Transporter Refueled. In 2022, Chabanol entered The Walking Dead universe playing a lead in the first installment of the anthology series, Tales of the Walking Dead, the latest incarnation of the successful AMC series.

Art work
In 2015, Chabanol opened her first solo art exhibition in New York City   "Born in Blue" curated by Monica Watkins. The show came along a short animated film depicting the birth of a Phoenix coming to life from the bottom of the Ocean. Her following body of work " Namsis" was introduced in a LA exhibition in 2018, followed by group show " WeRise" along many other artists. In 2019, she released her first children's book Blueboo, the story of a blue monster living in the Brown Woods who meets with the last caterpillar left in the forest.

Personal life
In February 2020, Chabanol became an American citizen.

Filmography

Feature films
 Fading Gigolo (2013)
 Third Person (2014)
 The Transporter Refueled (2015)

TV series
 Tales of the Walking Dead (2022)

Short films
 Psycho Nacirema (2013), Buster Keaton

References

External links
 
 
 

1982 births
Living people
Actresses from Paris
People with acquired American citizenship
French emigrants to the United States
French female models
French film actresses
French television actresses
American female models
American film actresses
American television actresses
21st-century French actresses
21st-century American actresses
French people of Vietnamese descent
French people of German descent
French people of Italian descent
American artists of Vietnamese descent
American people of Vietnamese descent
American people of German descent
American people of Italian descent